Companions in Crime (A.K.A.  Stryker Strikes Twice) is a 1954 British crime film directed by John Krish and starring Clifford Evans, George Woodbridge and Kenneth Haigh. The film is a spin-off from the television series Stryker of the Yard, and features two cases transmitted as separate TV episodes: The Case of the Two Brothers and The Case of the Black Falcon.

Plot
Two cases for "Inspector Stryker". In the first case, the detective utilises the aid of young Martha to clear her fiancé, John Kendall, who has been falsely convicted of murder. In the second, Stryker is tipped off that a yachtsman is a jewel smuggler.

Cast
 Clifford Evans - Chief Inspector Robert Stryker
 George Woodbridge - Sergeant Hawker
 Kenneth Haigh - John Kendall
 Maurice Kaufmann - Arnold Kendall
Christine Silver - Mrs. Kendall
 Eliot Makeham - Councillor Sandford
 Dorothy Alison - Sheila Marsden

References

External links

1954 films
Films directed by John Krish
1954 crime films
British crime films
1950s English-language films
British black-and-white films
1950s British films